Ivan Vasilyevich Travkin (Naro-Fominsk, Russia – 14 June 1985, Moscow) was a Soviet submarine commander, Captain 1st Rank, Hero of the Soviet Union (20 April 1945).

He was commander of the submarines ShCh-303 (Щ-303) and K-52. After his discharge from the Navy, in 1956, he lived and worked in Moscow.

Ivan Vasilyevich Travkin is buried in the Kuntsevo Cemetery, Moscow.

Awards
 Hero of the Soviet Union (awarded with the Gold Star medal; April 20, 1945, medal #5089)
 Three Orders of Lenin
 Two Orders of the Red Banner
 Order of Ushakov, 2nd class
 Order of the Patriotic War, 1st class
 Order of the Red Star
 Medal "For Battle Merit"
 Navy Cross (United States)
 campaign and jubilee medals

References

1908 births
1985 deaths
Burials at Kuntsevo Cemetery
Heroes of the Soviet Union
Recipients of the Navy Cross (United States)
Recipients of the Order of Lenin
Recipients of the Order of Ushakov, 2nd class
Recipients of the Order of the Red Banner
Soviet military personnel of World War II
Soviet submarine commanders
People from Moscow Governorate